Chicago Project Room (CPR) was a contemporary art gallery founded in 1996 by Michael Hall (at 2136 W. Chicago Avenue) in Chicago.

History
From 1996–98, there were many solo exhibitions from emerging artists, such Carol Jackson, Helen Mirra, Mindy Schwartz, Jane Benson, Nick Frank and others, developing an open space for emerging artists to produce solo exhibitions.

Daniel Hug joined the gallery in 1998 and the gallery relocated to a loft in Wicker Park (1464 N. Milwaukee Ave.), during this period CPR focused on promoting a smaller group of local artists and collaborating more with international artists who had yet to exhibit in Chicago.  CPR also participated in international art fairs LISTE, Basel (1999 and 2000) and Artforum Berlin among others. In summer 2000, the gallery moved to Los Angeles where it was located at 6130 Wilshire Boulevard, until its premature closure in 2002. The gallery organized many group and solo exhibitions and presented many positions for the first time in L.A., including Martin Boyce, Olaf Breuning, Torbjorn Rodland.

Michael Hall  opened his eponymous gallery in Vienna from 2003–2007 and is now working as an Independent Curator (Vienna / Chicago).  Daniel Hug later reopened in his eponymous gallery in Chinatown (L.A.) from 2003–2008 and is now the Artistic Director of Art Cologne.

Selected exhibited artists
The following artists exhibited at the gallery:

 Candice Breitz
 Gaylen Gerber
 Carol Jackson
 Wendy Jacob
 Alice Könitz
 Helen Mirra
 Muntean and Rosenblum
 Henrik Plenge Jacobsen
 Jennifer Reeder
 Gerwald Rockenschaub
 Mindy Schwartz
 Thaddeus Strode
 Margaret Welsh

Art fairs
Chicago Project Room participated in numerous art fairs including Art Chicago, Artforum Berlin, LISTE Basel and co-organized International Invitational (2001) at Art Chicago featuring upcoming galleries such as Asprey Jacques (London), Francesca Kaufmann (Milan), Gio Marconi (Milan), Meyer Riegger (Karlsruhe), Modern Art (London), Galleria Franco Noero (Turin), The Project (New York), Nils Staerk (Copenhagen) and The Modern Institute (Glasgow).

References

External links
 Chicago Project Room, Blogspot, UK
Press
 Official Website
Press
 Alan Artner, "Obfusification An Issue in the Work of Gaylen Gerber", Chicago Project Room, Chicago Tribune, February 27, 1998.
 Michelle Grabner, "Gaylen Gerber" at Chicago Project Room, frieze #40, May 1998.
 Laurie Palmer, "Helen Mirra" at Chicago Project Room, frieze #46, May 1999.

1996 establishments in Illinois
2002 disestablishments in Illinois
Art galleries established in 1996
Art galleries disestablished in 2002
Art museums and galleries in Chicago
Contemporary art galleries in the United States